Juan Camps Mas (1883 – 21 April 1921) was a Spanish rower. He competed in the men's coxed four event at the 1900 Summer Olympics.

References

External links

1883 births
1921 deaths
Spanish male rowers
Olympic rowers of Spain
Rowers at the 1900 Summer Olympics
Rowers from Barcelona
Real Club Marítimo de Barcelona rowers
Date of birth missing